The King of England Will Not Pay (Italian: Il re d'Inghilterra non paga) is a 1941 Italian historical drama film directed by Giovacchino Forzano and starring Andrea Checchi, Silvana Jachino and Osvaldo Valenti.

It was shot at the Tirrenia Studios. The film's sets were designed by the art directors Antonio Valente and Savino Fino.

Synopsis
In the thirteenth century a leading Florentine banking family are faced with ruin when the King of England refuses to repay a large loan he has taken out from them.

Main cast

References

Bibliography 
 Gundle, Stephen. Fame Amid the Ruins: Italian Film Stardom in the Age of Neorealism. Berghahn Books, 2019.

External links 
 

1941 films
Italian historical films
1940s historical films
1940s Italian-language films
Films directed by Giovacchino Forzano
Films set in the 14th century
Films set in Florence
Films about banking
1940s Italian films